The 2019–20 season was Unione Sportiva Lecce's first season back in Serie A since being relegated at the end of the 2010–11 Serie A season. The club competed in Serie A and in the Coppa Italia, starting in the third round.

The season was coach Fabio Liverani's third in charge and second full season after being appointed in September 2017.

Players

Squad information
Last updated on 9 February 2020
Appearances include league matches only

Transfers

In

Loans in

Out

Loans out

Pre-season and friendlies

Competitions

Serie A

League table

Results summary

Results by round

Matches

Coppa Italia

Statistics

Appearances and goals

|-
! colspan=14 style=background:#DCDCDC; text-align:center"| Goalkeepers

|-
! colspan=14 style=background:#DCDCDC; text-align:center"| Defenders

|-
! colspan=14 style=background:#DCDCDC; text-align:center"| Midfielders

|-
! colspan=14 style=background:#DCDCDC; text-align:center"| Forwards

|-
! colspan=14 style=background:#DCDCDC; text-align:center"| Players transferred out during the season

Goalscorers

Last updated: 9 February 2020

Clean sheets

Last updated: 9 February 2020

Disciplinary record

Last updated: 9 February 2020

References

U.S. Lecce seasons
Lecce